The  is a rapid transit electric multiple unit (EMU) train type operated by Osaka Municipal Subway in Japan since 2009.

Design
Thirteen six-car sets were built based on the New 20 series design to replace the older 30 series sets on the Tanimachi Line.

A total of 12 ten-car 30000 series sets are also on order for use on the Midōsuji Line, with the first set entering service on 10 December 2011, replacing the older 10 series sets.

Formations

6-car sets
, the Tanimachi Line fleet consists of 13 six-car trainsets and are formed as follows, with car 1 at the Yao-Minami end.

Car 3 is designated as a women-only car (rush hour only).

10-car sets
, the Midōsuji Line fleet consists of three ten-car trainsets and are formed as follows, with car 1 at the Nakamozu end.

Car 6 is designated as a women-only car (weekdays only).

Interior
Midosuji Line sets from 31604 onward incorporate a number of design improvements, including new seat covers, LED lighting, and pairs of wide-screen LCD passenger information displays above the doorways.

History
The first Tanimachi Line set was unveiled in October 2008 and entered service on 18 March 2009.

30000A series 

An improved derivative of the 30000 series, the 30000A series, was first announced by Osaka Metro on 9 December 2021. Changes from the 30000 series include a lower center of gravity, yellow-and-turquoise seat moquette, improved accessibility, and onboard air purifiers. A total of ten 6-car 30000A series sets are due to be built. The fleet will begin operation in July 22, 2022 on Osaka Metro Chūō Line and Kintetsu Keihanna Line through services. Following the 2025 World Expo, the fleet is scheduled to be cascaded to the Tanimachi Line.

Fleet history
The build history for the fleet is as shown below.

References

External links

 Osaka Municipal Transport Bureau website
 Kinki Sharyo 30000 series details 
 Preview of the new 30000 series trains for Midōsuji Line

Electric multiple units of Japan
30000 series
30000 series
Train-related introductions in 2009
750 V DC multiple units
Kawasaki multiple units
Kinki Sharyo multiple units